Ella (Her) is the fifteenth  studio album by Juan Gabriel, released in 1980. Available only for a very short time and distributed by RCA (Juan Gabriel's original record label) with some songs not used previously at any record for example; the first version of "Te Sigo Amando" and some B sides.

Track listing

References 

1980 albums
Juan Gabriel albums